Lars Sæter (13 May 1895 – 27 May 1988) was a Norwegian politician for the Christian Democratic Party.

He was born in Surendal.

He was elected to the Norwegian Parliament from Sør-Trøndelag in 1954, and was re-elected on one occasion.

Sæter was a member of the executive committee of Trondheim city council between 1945 and 1947, and a member of Surnadal municipality council in 1963–1964.

References

1895 births
1988 deaths
Christian Democratic Party (Norway) politicians
Members of the Storting
20th-century Norwegian politicians